Halolaguna palinensis is a moth in the family Lecithoceridae. It is endemic to Taiwan.

The wingspan is about 15 mm. The forewings are greyish brown with dark brown discal dots and an indistinct postmedial line, followed by a darker area. The pre-tornal patch is dark brown and the costa is covered with dark brown scales beyond three-fourths.

Etymology
The species name refers to the collecting locality.

References

Halolaguna
Moths of Taiwan
Endemic fauna of Taiwan
Moths described in 2000